Platycryptus undatus, also called the tan or familiar jumping spider, is a species of jumping spider.

Description

The bodies of these spiders are rather compressed in the vertical direction, which allows them to hide themselves under the loosened bark of trees and in other tight places. They have a prominent chevron-like pattern on their abdomens which may make them more difficult to distinguish on mottled surfaces.

Females of this species are between 10 and 13 mm in body length, and males range from 8.5 to 9.5 mm. 

It favors vertical surfaces such as fences, walls, etc. and because of its habits it is easily seen. These spiders are not inclined to bite, but even though they are rather small they can deliver a defensive bite if they are pinched or squeezed.

Eggs are laid and hatch during the summer, and adults and other stages overwinter in their individual silken shelters. Although the shelters are built separately and keep the spiders out of direct contact with each other, Kaston reports that as many as fifty of them may crowd their shelters for hibernation together so tightly that they form a continuous blanket under the loose bark of a standing tree.

Distribution

Platycryptus undatus occurs in North and Central America. The distribution of this species ranges from the Eastern States and adjacent Canada, to Texas and Wisconsin.

References

  (2008): The world spider catalog, version 8.5. American Museum of Natural History.

External links

 Picture of P. undatus (free for noncommercial use)
 Good information on spiders' lifestyles from the University of Kansas.
 Lucian K. Ross: A jumping spider feeding on an earthworm. Peckhamia, 71, 1, S. 1-2, September 2008 PDF

Salticidae
Spiders of North America
Spiders of Central America
Spiders described in 1778